The Church of Our Lady of the Scapular of Mount Carmel was a former Roman Catholic parish church that was demolished. The church was located 341 East 28th Street between First and Second Avenues in the Kips Bay neighborhood of Manhattan, New York City. The parish was established in 1889. The building is believed to have been erected that year, designed in the Country Gothic style. It was previously staffed by the Carmelite Fathers and was the original location of the National Shrine of Our Lady of Mount Carmel, which had been established in 1941 and was moved to Middletown, New York in 1991.

The parish was merged with that of the Church of St. Stephen the Martyr in the 1980s, with the newly combined parish named Our Lady of the Scapular–St. Stephen. The sanctuary at 341 East 28th Street was torn down. In January 2007, it was announced by the Archdiocese of New York that the Church of the Sacred Hearts of Mary and Jesus, located at 307 East 33rd Street, was to be merged into Our Lady of the Scapular–St. Stephen Church.

References 
Notes

Bibliography
Dunlap, David W. From Abyssinian to Zion: A Guide to Manhattan's Houses of Worship. (New York: Columbia University Press, 2004.).

Roman Catholic Archdiocese of New York
Roman Catholic churches in Manhattan
Roman Catholic churches completed in 1889
19th-century Baptist churches in the United States
Religious organizations established in 1889
Gothic Revival church buildings in New York City
Closed churches in the Roman Catholic Archdiocese of New York
Closed churches in New York City
Demolished churches in New York City
Demolished buildings and structures in Manhattan
Italian-American culture in New York City
19th-century Roman Catholic church buildings in the United States